BNS Duranta  is a Type 024 missile boat of the Bangladesh Navy. It was in service from 1983 to 2017.

Design
The ship carried two SY-1 anti-ship missiles. It was also armed with two Type 61 25 mm (II x 2) guns. For surface search, it had a Type 352 Square Tie radar.

Career
BNS Duranta was commissioned on 6 April 1983. In the cyclone of 1991, the ship was damaged and later on repaired. She was decommissioned from the Bangladesh Navy on 30 March 2017. Later on she was scrapped.

References

Ships of the Bangladesh Navy
Missile boats of the Bangladesh Navy